Suma Kanakala (née Pallassana Paachuveettil; born on 22 March 1974) is an Indian television presenter, actress, and television producer who predominantly works in Telugu television. She is best known for hosting ETV's Star Mahilaa Telugu TV game show, which is the longest-running TV game show in India and ran for exactly 12 years.

Early life
Suma was born on 22 March 1974 in her native hometown of Palakkad, Kerala, India. She was born to a Malayali orthodox family and her parents are Pranavi Narayanan Kutty Nair and Pallassana Paachuveettil Vimala who were associated in Secunderabad, Andhra Pradesh (now in Telangana), India for a very long time because of the father's job transfer near Lalaguda & Mettuguda railways in Secunderabad. She studied at St. Ann’s high school near Tarnaka colony and did her Railway Degree College in Lalaguda. Suma was born 10 years later after her parents’ marriage as the only child for them. After six months of her mother’s delivery, she along with her parents flew to Secunderabad where she was brought up near Lalaguda & Mettuguda railways. She married Tollywood actor, Rajeev Kanakala on 10 February 1999 near Sridhar Function Hall in Hyderabad. The wedding took place near Kairadabad junction near Lakdi Kapul station. They have two children- one son named Roshan Karthik Kanakala (born on 15 March 2000) & Snehanaswini Kanakala (born on 31 August 2005). In addition to her mother tongue of Malayalam, she is fluent in Telugu, Hindi, Tamil, and English.

Career
A presenter aged 16, she has hosted many Telugu film audio launches, film awards and functions. She is a Malayali from Kerala, but speaks Telugu fluently.  She has acted in various serial and telefilms since 1995, her breakthrough came with the boom in satellite channels. Swayamvaram, Anveshitha, Geethanjali, and Ravoyi Chandamama were her major serials. She didn't have any interest in working in films. Kanakala's flagship show is Star Mahila on ETV, which attracted many female audiences. She created a record by this show becoming one of the longest running women game show in India. Her versatility is evident in Panchavataram on TV9. Cash on ETV and Start music on MAA TV are her current prime time shows. Kanakala started her own production house named K. Suma Rajeev Creations on 26 December 2012 and has produced a show named Lakku Kikku which is telecast on Zee Telugu. She also worked in a show named Genes on ETV. Her Kevvu Keka on MAA TV with co-star Mano and produced by K. Suma Rajeev Creations. Kanakala also sang "Suya Suya" song from the 2017 Telugu film Winner. She is well known for her spontaneous and humorous remarks during her shows.

Filmography

As an actress 
Source

Films

Television
 Amaravathi ki Kathayein (1994–1995)
 Anveshitha
 Matti Manishi
 Veyi padagalu
Swayamvaram
Geetanjali
Soundarya Lahari
House of Hungama (2020) on Star Maa

As host

 Avakayyara on Star Maa
Lady boss on maaTV now Star Maa
Pattukunte Pattu Cheera on Teja TV now Gemini Movies
Star Mahila on ETV
Swarabhishekam on ETV
Panchavataram on TV9 
Pelli Choopulu along with Pradeep Machiraju on Star Maa
Cash on ETV (both versions 1.0 and 2.0) 
Bhale Chance Le on Star Maa
Lakku Kikku on Zee Telugu (also producer)
Genes on ETV (both versions 1.0 and 2.0) 
Kevvu Keka on MAA TV
Connexion on MAA TV
Avvakayara on MAA TV
T TIME
E Junction on ETV Plus
GENES 2.0 on ETV
Jujubi TV on YouTube
Sell Me The Answer on Star Maa
F3 – Fun, family & Frustration on Star Maa
Wife Chethilo Life on Star Maa
Big Celebrity Challenge (Season 3) on Zee Telugu
Start Music (Season 3) on Star Maa
Suma Adda on ETV

Television specials
 8th SIIMA 2019
 CineMAA Awards 2012 & 2013
 Gemini Puraskaaralu
 Apsara awards

Other shows
Bigg Boss S1 on Star Maa as inspection officer
Sixth Sense as Participant
All Is Well on Aha

Awards
 Nandi Award for Best TV Anchor 2010Panchavataram 
 Limca Fresh Face Award 2009
 Local TV Media Awards Best AnchorStar Mahila (2010)
 Cinegoer Award Best AnchorStar Mahila (2010)
 Got placed in Limca Book of World Records for successful completion of Star Mahilas 2000 episodes. 
Apsara Awards 2018: Entertainer of the year

References

External links

Suma Kanakala visit Website

Indian women television presenters
Living people
Actresses in Malayalam cinema
Indian film actresses
Actresses from Kerala
1974 births
Telugu television anchors
20th-century Indian actresses
21st-century Indian actresses
Actresses in Telugu television
Actresses in Telugu cinema
Indian game show hosts
Indian soap opera actresses
Indian television talk show hosts